Glen George Baker (9 August 1915 – 15 December 1943) was an Australian cricketer. He was a right-handed batsman and right-arm medium bowler. He played 29 first-class cricket matches, all but one for Queensland, between 1936 and 1942, scoring 1531 runs and taking 13 wickets.

References

External links
 

1915 births
Australian cricketers
Queensland cricketers
Sportsmen from Queensland
1943 deaths
Australian military personnel killed in World War II
Australian Army personnel of World War II
Australian Army officers